Epibator is a genus of skinks endemic to New Caledonia.

Species
The following 3 species, listed alphabetically by specific name, are recognized as being valid:

Epibator greeri (Böhme, 1979) – Greer's tree skink
Epibator insularis Sadlier et al., 2019 
Epibator nigrofasciolatus (Peters, 1869) – green-bellied tree skink

Note that a binomial authority in parentheses indicates that the species was originally described in a genus other than Epibator.

References

Lizard genera
Endemic fauna of New Caledonia
Epibator
Taxa named by Ross Allen Sadlier
Taxa named by Aaron M. Bauer
Taxa named by Glenn Michael Shea
Taxa named by Sarah A. Smith